Joan Pedrola (born 1990 in Barcelona, Catalonia, Spain) is a Spanish male model. Known for his lips and pout he has lent his face to ad campaigns such as D&G and Mango.

Currently ranks No.49 in MODELS.com's Top 50 Male Models.

Career
Joan Pedrola was passing by an agency (which eventually became his mother agency) when he was stopped in the street by Eduardo, now his agent, who propose he try modeling. In 2009 he signs with Major Model Management. His first campaign was for the resort ad, D&G Cruise 09 photographed by Mario Testino. In March 2010 he was featured on the cover of 160 Grams magazine, photographed by Eric Sposito. Pedrola's first TV spot was for the f/w 10 perfume 212 VIP by Carolina Herrera. Has walked fashion shows in New York, Milan and Paris for designers: Neil Barrett, Thierry Mugler, Tim Hamilton, Roberto Cavalli, Prada, Dolce & Gabbana, Pringle of Scotland, Van Noten, Issey Miyake, Kenzo, Raf Simons, Richard Chai, Michael Bastian, Yigal Azrouel, DKNY, 3.1 Phillip Lim, Michael Kors, Diesel, and Versace.

References

1990 births
Living people
Spanish male models
People from Barcelona